St Woolos Cemetery (officially named Newport and St Woolos new Cemetery)  is the main cemetery in the city of Newport, Wales situated one mile to the west of the Church in Wales cathedral known by the same name. It contains four chapels, and various ornate memorials dating back to the early Victorian period, and was the first municipally constructed cemetery in England and Wales. It remains in use to this present day as the main cemetery for burials in Newport, and has been used as a filming location for the BBC series, Doctor Who. The cemetery is listed on the Cadw/ICOMOS Register of Parks and Gardens of Special Historic Interest in Wales.

History 
In the first half of the nineteenth century, the graveyard immediately outside St Woolos Cathedral had become full, but burials continued to take place there in the shallow soil covering the existing graves. This became a public health hazard, and "represented a ghoulish aspect with coffins protruding from the ground, many broken open with the grisly contents spilling out." In 1842, a new cemetery was opened near to the cathedral on Clifton Road, however, this too quickly became full, and new arrangements had to be made.

Land was obtained from the Tredegar Estate between Risca Road and Bassaleg Road, and a new cemetery was constructed – the first municipally-constructed cemetery in Britain. The first interment in the new cemetery was that of a sailor named Cooper, and took place on 1 July 1854.<ref>Newport Past website – Newport South Wales UK News For 1854  Newport First Stop' – 100 Years of News Stories – 1854] (Retrieved 14 May 2011)</ref>

The cathedral graveyard continued to be used for new interments until it was finally closed in 1866, though in latter years these had primarily been the additional interments in existing family plots. Other chapels in the town continued to make use of their own graveyards until 1869, by which time they had all closed. From that point forward, all burials in Newport took place in the new cemetery, until a second public cemetery was opened in Christchurch, Newport in 1883.

 Cemetery Listed Buildings and Structures 
St Woolos Cemetery is listed on the Cadw/ICOMOS Register of Parks and Gardens of Special Historic Interest in Wales. It contains a number of listed buildings, mostly from the Victorian period. Of these, only one remains in use.

Lodge

Completed in 1855, the original lodge is constructed of "coursed rubble stonework and ashlar quoins and window surrounds." On the wall to the left of the entrance a blue plaque has been erected in commemorate artist James Flewitt Mullock, who was also clerk to the Newport and St Woolos Burial Board.

This building has been identified by the Royal Commission on the Ancient and Historical Monuments of Wales (RCAHMW) as being under threat. As a result, it was the subject of emergency recording in 2004,.

This lodge is no longer used as a dwelling, but is used as the cemetery office. This original lodge is located at the main entrance to the cemetery on Bassaleg Road, as opposed to the more modern lodge located on Risca Road. The more modern lodge remains occupied as a dwelling, but is not a listed building.

Anglican Chapel

This is a Gothic style building, entered via a columned porch in the western gable. The building is one of a pair of symmetrical chapels facing each other across a circular plot near the main Bassaleg Road entrance to the cemetery. The Anglican chapel is the easterly building of this pairing, with the Non-conformist chapel at the west. The Anglican chapel has a neo-gothic lancet arch. The shape of the archway is mirrored by the hood mould above the door within, which features carved head stops. On the gable above the archway is a niche to accommodate a statue, but this has not been populated. The building has no tower or spire, however, does have a bell-gable where the roof line changes between the nave and the chancel. As of 25 May 2011, the single bell remains extant.

This building was in use as a chapel up until 1997, although as of 2011 it appears to be unused and littered with debris.

 Non-conformist Chapel 

A Romanesque style building, forming the westerly building in the symmetrical pair of chapels at the main entrance on Bassaleg Road. While the two chapels are symettrical in their positioning and dimensions, there are significant stylistic differences between the two. Firstly, the Non-conformist chapel features a distinctive circular tower with a conical, slate roof over the chancel, as opposed to the simple bell-gable of the Anglican chapel. Secondly, the porch features a Norman style, rounded arch, with dog's tooth decoration, as opposed to the gothic arch of the Anglican chapel. Thirdly, where the Anglican chapel has a niche in the gable above the arch to accommodate a statue, the Non-conformist chapel features a small, single light, Norman-arched window into the roof space above the porch. The Non-conformist chapel also features a decorative pattern on the roof using tiles of different shapes and materials.

As with the Anglican Chapel, RCAMH recorded the building still being used as a chapel in 1997, however, as of 2011, the chapel appears to be disused, in a similar condition to the Anglican chapel.

 Roman Catholic Chapel 

This building stands alone within the cemetery grounds, due south from the Risca Road/Fields Park Road roundabout, the windows of this chapel have now been bricked up. RCAMH recorded this building as being 'disused' in 1997.

Synagogue and Jew's Burial Ground

The Synagogue and Jewish cemetery are outside and to the north of the main cemetery, within Coed-Melyn Park.  The entrance to the synagogue is on Risca Road, to the east of the Fields Park Road roundabout. This small octagonal building is a modern extension to an older Jewish chapel of Rest, which opened in 1871.  The building's small stained glass windows contain a Star of David motif.  The burial ground is situated behind the synagogue, containing large gravestones with Hebrew inscriptions. Among these are Commonwealth war graves of an airman and three soldiers of the Pioneer Corps from World War II.

A 2007 photographic survey of the building showed a well maintained interior, but in 2013, the Sifrei Torah from this congregation was handed over to an Israeli Jewish community in this building to secure ongoing usage of the Torah, and a request was made to the local community in June 2017 to find an alternative use for this building, which has now fallen into disuse.

There is also a more recent Jewish burial ground within the cemetery itself, with a small, red-brick chapel of rest. The burial ground is also locked, being surrounded by a tall fence. Unlike the older synagogue and burial ground, this structure is not listed.

 Mortuary Chapel 
The Mortuary Chapel, situated near to the mortuary on the thoroughfare between the Basslag Road and Risca Road entrances,  is also grade II listed. Unlike the other chapels in the cemetery, this chapel was entered through a door at the side of the nave, rather than the gable end. The building has rose windows on each gable-end, which would have provided light into the chapel, but are now boarded up.
This chapel is no longer used for its original purpose, and the fabric of the building is showing significant signs of decay.

Eastern entrance

The gates, piers and flanking walls at the main entrance to the cemetery from Bassaleg Road are also listed. This entrance provides vehicular access to the cemetery.

 Friends of St Woolos Cemetery 
In 2019 a trust was formed to support the cemetery. This much loved and visited area in the heart of the city contains a wealth of art, architecture, history, flora and fauna.

Notable interments
 Annie Brewer – WWI nurse, Legion d'Honneur and the Croix de Guerre recipient
 John Byrne VC – Crimean War Victoria Cross recipient
 Arthur Gould – Welsh rugby's first superstar
 Jon Lee – drummer of the rock band Feeder
 Miles Moseley – Abercarn colliery disaster, Albert Medal recipient

Notable memorials
In addition to the buildings within the cemetery, there are a number of notable memorials within the site.

Newport Docks Disaster Memorial

The cemetery contains a coarse finished, granite obelisk in memory of the victims of the Newport Docks disaster. On 2 July 1909, 39 men were killed when the retaining wall in the excavation which would become an extension to the Alexandra Dock collapsed, trapping the men in mud, water and debris.

At the foot of the memorial are three brass plaques. The first contains a list of the names of the men killed in the disaster. Some of the men were known solely by their surname, as recorded in the pay book, as they were migrant workers employed temporarily on the docks site. The second plaque contains a poem the then editor of the South Wales Argus, W.J. Collins, called Soldiers of Industry.

The final plaque records the purpose of the memorial, to commemorate "the 39 men who lost their lives in the Trench Disaster at the New Dock Works". The memorial was erected by the contractors responsible for undertaking the work, Easton Gibb & Son.

War memorial
In the midpoint between the symmetrical chapels at the main entrance, a Cross of Sacrifice war memorial commemorating local men who died in World War I (then known as 'the Great War') was erected by the Commonwealth War Graves Commission at  It commemorates the 197 soldiers and sailor buried between this cemetery and the Christchurch cemetery, also in Newport.

Commonwealth War Graves
St Woolos Cemetery contains the war graves of 167 Commonwealth service personnel of World War I and 98 of World War II, besides 10 foreign national service graves the Commonwealth War Graves Commission are responsible for.

 World War I Graves 
In 2018, Newport remembered those who gave their lives 100 years ago in the Great War. The names of over 1500 are currently known but the list continues to grow as more are discovered.  In 1921, Newport Council sent teachers around every residence in the town to record the names of those who served and died in the war. This very accurate record was published in a booklet called "The Newport Roll of Honour". The original records are now held at Gwent Archives. However, researchers continue to find omissions from this list and interesting stories of those who perished but were not included. Not all of those who are buried and identified by the CWGC (above) with an official headstone, and some like Annie Brewer are (currently) not even recognised by this body. Some such as Florence Johnstone who are buried here do not qualify for an official War Dead status despite being killed in war duties (Armaments Factory). The Gwent branch of the Western Front Association carried out a survey of Newport dead in advance of the 2018 commemoration and continue to identify missing names.

The cemetery in popular culture
The cemetery was used as a filming location for the 2007 Doctor Who episode Blink  and the 2008 Christmas Special where the Cybermen attack the mourners, both starring David Tennant. The cemetery features as a location in the crime thriller novel "We Go Down Slowly Rising" by Newport author John Gimblett.

Joe Strummer, of the Clash, was employed as a grave digger in this cemetery until his return to London in 1973.JoeStrummer.org – "Bio" (Retrieved 7 February 2014)

 References 

 Mike Buckingham and Richard Frame, A Haunted Holy Ground'' (1988)

External links 
 Newport Past – History of the City of Newport Mon Wales Monmouthshire Gwent UK Great Britain England
 

Buildings and structures in Newport, Wales
Registered historic parks and gardens in Newport
Cemeteries in Wales
Commonwealth War Graves Commission cemeteries in Wales
History of Newport, Wales
Landmarks in Newport, Wales